Viscount De L'Isle, of Penshurst in the County of Kent, is a title in the Peerage of the United Kingdom. It was created in 1956 for William Sidney, 6th Baron de L'Isle and Dudley, VC, KG, GCMG, GCVO (1909–1991).

History
This branch of the Shelley family descends from John Shelley-Sidney, the only son of the second marriage of Sir Bysshe Shelley, 1st Baronet, of Castle Goring (see Shelley Baronets for earlier history of the family) by Elizabeth Jane, daughter of William Perry and Elizabeth, daughter and heir of the Hon. Thomas Sidney, fourth son of Robert Sidney, 4th Earl of Leicester (a title which had become extinct in 1743; see the Earl of Leicester 1618 creation). In 1799 he assumed by Royal licence the additional surname of Sidney on succeeding to the estates, including Penshurst Place in Kent, of his maternal grandmother. In 1818 he was created a Baronet, of Penshurst in the County of Kent, in the Baronetage of the United Kingdom.

His son and heir apparent, Philip Sidney, represented Eye in the House of Commons. In 1835, fourteen years before succeeding his father in the baronetcy, he was raised to the Peerage of the United Kingdom as Baron De L'Isle and Dudley, of Penshurst in the County of Kent. He was son-in-law of then King William IV. The title derived from the fact that the title of "Viscount De L'Isle" had been held by his ancestors the Earls of Leicester (in turn deriving from their ancestors), but had become extinct along with the earldom in 1743. The title of "Dudley" came from the fact that Robert Sidney, 1st Earl of Leicester (of the 1618 creation) was the nephew of Robert Dudley, 1st Earl of Leicester (of the 1564 creation), the fifth son of John Dudley, 1st Duke of Northumberland, who was as well Viscount Lisle by right of his mother. Lord De L'Isle and Dudley discontinued the use of the surname Shelley.

His grandson, the fifth Baron (who only held the titles for two months in 1945 after succeeding his elder brother), notably served as Mayor of Chelsea and was a member of the London County Council. His son, the sixth Baron, was a prominent Conservative politician and served as Secretary of State for Air from 1951 to 1955. In 1956 he was created Viscount De L'Isle, of Penshurst in the County of Kent, in the Peerage of the United Kingdom. Lord De L'Isle later served as Governor-General of Australia. In 1965 he also succeeded his kinsman as ninth Baronet of Castle Goring.  the titles are held by his son, the second Viscount, who succeeded in 1991.

The family seat is Penshurst Place, near Tonbridge, Kent. Close to it is the parish church of St John the Baptist where the Sidney Chapel houses many memorials to the family.

Shelley-Sidney Baronets, of Penshurst Place (1818)
Sir John Shelley-Sidney, 1st Baronet (1771–1849)
Sir Philip Sidney, 2nd Baronet (1800–1851) (created Baron De L'Isle and Dudley in 1835)

Barons De L'Isle and Dudley (1835)
Philip Sidney, 1st Baron De L'Isle and Dudley (1800–1851)
Philip Sidney, 2nd Baron De L'Isle and Dudley (1828–1898)
Philip Sidney, 3rd Baron De L'Isle and Dudley (1853–1922)
Algernon Sidney, 4th Baron De L'Isle and Dudley (1854–1945)
William Sidney, 5th Baron De L'Isle and Dudley (1859–1945)
William Sidney, 6th Baron De L'Isle and Dudley (1909–1991) (created Viscount De L'Isle in 1956)

Viscounts De L'Isle (1956)
William Sidney, 1st Viscount De L'Isle (1909–1991)
Philip Sidney, 2nd Viscount De L'Isle (b. 1945)

The heir apparent is the present holder's only son the Hon. Philip William Edmund Sidney (b. 1985).

Line of Succession

  Philip John Algernon Sidney, 2nd Viscount De L'Isle (born 1945)
 (1) Hon. Philip William Edmund Sidney (b. 1985)

See also
Shelley Baronets, of Castle Goring
Earl of Leicester (1563 and 1618 creations)
Duke of Northumberland (1551 creation)
Viscount Lisle
Baron Lisle

References

Sources

Kidd, Charles, Williamson, David (editors). Debrett's Peerage and Baronetage (1990 edition). New York: St Martin's Press, 1990.

Viscountcies in the Peerage of the United Kingdom
1956 establishments in the United Kingdom
Noble titles created in 1956
Noble titles created for UK MPs